Mario Cingolani (Rome, 2 August 1883 – Rome, 8 April 1971) was an Italian politician.

He graduated in chemistry from the Sapienza University of Rome.

He was a deputy in the XXV(1919–1921), XXVI (1921–1924) and in the XXVII (1924–1929) parliamentary term of the Kingdom of Italy, as member of the Italian People's Party. In 1926 he was declared fallen from office. In 1922 he served also as Undersecretary for Labor in the Facta I and II Government.

In 1944 he was part of the High Commissioner for the punishment of the crimes and offenses of fascism, in the Section for the evocation of regime profits.

In 1946 was elected to the Constituent Assembly among the ranks of the Christian Democracy and in 1948 was appointed Senator by right, on the basis of art. III of the transitional and final provisions of the Italian Constitution. He was re-elected to the Senate in the 1953, 1958 and 1963 general elections.

He served as Minister of Air Force from 13 July 1946 to 2 February 1947 in the De Gasperi II Government and as Minister of Defence from 31 May 1947 to 15 December 1947 in the De Gasperi IV Government.

External links
CINGOLANI, Mario's profile on treccani.it

1883 births
1971 deaths
Politicians from Rome
Italian People's Party (1919) politicians
Christian Democracy (Italy) politicians
Government ministers of Italy
Italian Ministers of Defence
Deputies of Legislature XXV of the Kingdom of Italy
Deputies of Legislature XXVI of the Kingdom of Italy
Deputies of Legislature XXVII of the Kingdom of Italy
Members of the National Council (Italy)
Members of the Constituent Assembly of Italy
Senators of Legislature I of Italy
Senators of Legislature II of Italy
Senators of Legislature III of Italy
Senators of Legislature IV of Italy
Sapienza University of Rome alumni
Italian Aventinian secessionists